Charles Auguste Briot (19 July 1817  St Hippolyte, Doubs, Franche-Comté, France – 20 September 1882  Bourg-d'Ault, France) was a French mathematician who worked on elliptic functions. The Académie des Sciences awarded him the Poncelet Prize in 1882.

See also
Holomorphic function
Timeline of abelian varieties

References

External links
 
 

Academic staff of the École pratique des hautes études
École Normale Supérieure alumni
19th-century French mathematicians
1817 births
1882 deaths
People from Doubs